Farmington Correctional Center (FCC) is a Missouri Department of Corrections state prison for men located in Farmington, Missouri, located in St. Francois County, Missouri.  According to the Official Manual State of Missouri the facility has a capacity of 2632 minimum and medium security prisoners, making it one of the largest prisons in the state.

The facility opened in December 1986 on the former grounds of the Farmington State Hospital mental health facility, founded in 1903.

References

Prisons in Missouri
Buildings and structures in St. Francois County, Missouri
1986 establishments in Missouri